Ronald David Johnson (March 23, 1956 – January 26, 2021) was an American baseball player, coach and minor league manager. From 2012 through 2018, he managed the Norfolk Tides of the International League, Triple-A farm system affiliate of the Baltimore Orioles. His 2018 season with Norfolk was his 14th season as a Triple-A manager; Johnson formerly helmed the Pawtucket Red Sox of the International League (2005–09), and the Omaha Royals (1998) and Omaha Golden Spikes (1999) of the Triple-A Pacific Coast League.

Johnson was a first baseman for the Kansas City Royals and Montreal Expos during his brief Major League Baseball (MLB) playing career from 1982 to 1984. Johnson was also a former first base coach of the Boston Red Sox of MLB.

Playing career
When in high school, Johnson turned down football scholarships to UCLA and Fresno State University, and instead chose to play baseball at Fresno State.  Johnson was originally drafted by the California Angels in the 13th round of the 1976 Major League Baseball draft, but did not sign. He was named to the 1978 College Baseball All-America Team by the American Baseball Coaches Association. He graduated from Fresno State before being drafted by the Kansas City Royals in the 24th round, with the 595th overall pick, in the 1978 MLB draft. He made his major league debut with the Royals on September 12, 1982. On December 15, 1983, the Royals traded Johnson to the Montreal Expos for Tom Dixon.

Johnson played in 22 major league games over parts of three seasons, batting .261 with 12 hits, including two doubles and two runs batted in. He played 830 games in the minor leagues, most of them at the Triple-A level.

Coaching and managerial career

Kansas City Royals
Shortly after his playing days ended in 1985, Johnson became a coach in the Royals' minor league system.  He served as a coach within the Kansas City organization for six seasons, before becoming a manager.

Johnson made his managerial debut with the Baseball City Royals (Class A) of the Florida State League in 1992.  He won Texas League Manager of the Year honors in 1995, after guiding the Wichita Wranglers (Double-A) to the playoffs.  Three years later, he reached Triple-A as manager of the Omaha Royals, and in 1999 he led that club to a first-place finish in the Pacific Coast League.  In total, Johnson posted six winning seasons in his eight years managing in the Royals' organization.

Boston Red Sox
Johnson joined the Boston Red Sox organization in 2000 as manager of the Sarasota Red Sox (Class A) of the Florida State League. In 2002, Johnson was promoted to Double-A as manager of the Trenton Thunder of the Eastern League. When the Red Sox switched Double-A affiliations to the Portland Sea Dogs in 2003, he moved with them and was manager of the Sea Dogs for the next two seasons. His 2003 club went 72–70 and missed the Eastern League playoffs by just a game and a half. In 2004, Johnson once again had Portland near .500 for much of the year before finishing at 69–73 and in a tie for 4th-place in the Eastern League Northern Division. From 2005 to 2009, Johnson served as manager for Boston's Triple-A affiliate, the Pawtucket Red Sox.

On November 23, 2009, Johnson was appointed as first base coach for the major league Red Sox.  He held the post for two seasons, but on October 5, 2011, Johnson was fired from the Red Sox staff following the departure of manager Terry Francona.

Baltimore Orioles
Johnson was next appointed manager of the Norfolk Tides, Triple-A affiliate of the Baltimore Orioles, and led them to back-to-back winning seasons in 2012 and 2013. In 2015, he managed the Tides to a division title and was named the International League Manager of the Year. The 2018 campaign marked his seventh consecutive year as Norfolk's manager, and he holds the franchise record for games won as a manager (491). During the year, Johnson was named the winner of the Orioles' Cal Ripken Sr. Player Development Award, but at the close of the season, he was released by the Baltimore organization as it underwent a significant front-office transition amid the departures of general manager Dan Duquette and manager Buck Showalter.

Johnson's minor league managerial record was 1,752–1,770 (.497) over 25 seasons.

Personal life
Johnson and his wife, Daphne, had five children.

His son Chris was drafted in the 37th round by the Red Sox in June 2003 but instead opted for college; and was later drafted by the Houston Astros. Primarily a third baseman, Chris Johnson spent a dozen years in professional baseball, including all or parts of eight seasons (2009–16) in the majors with five teams. He had a breakout season in 2013 with the Atlanta Braves, finishing second in the National League batting race at .321.  He also led the Braves in doubles (34) and finished second on the club in hits (165). Chris spent part of the 2017 season reunited with his father as a member of the Triple-A Tides in the Baltimore organization.

Johnson took an emergency leave from his coaching duties with the Red Sox on August 1, 2010, after his youngest daughter was seriously injured when hit by a car while horse riding. He missed the rest of the season but was able to return to the Red Sox at the outset of spring training in 2011.

Johnson died as a result of COVID-19 on January 26, 2021, at the age of 64.

See also

List of second-generation Major League Baseball players

References

Further reading

External links

 Triple-A Norfolk Tides manager Ron Johnson chats with Jim Hunter via YouTube

1956 births
2021 deaths
All-American college baseball players
American expatriate baseball players in Canada
Baseball coaches from California
Baseball players from Long Beach, California
Boston Red Sox coaches
Buffalo Bisons (minor league) players
California State University, Fresno alumni
Deaths from the COVID-19 pandemic in Tennessee
Fort Myers Royals players
Fresno State Bulldogs baseball players
Fullerton College alumni
Fullerton Hornets baseball players
Gulf Coast Royals players
Indianapolis Indians players
Jacksonville Suns players
Kansas City Royals players
Major League Baseball first basemen
Montreal Expos players
Nashville Sounds players
Norfolk Tides managers
Omaha Royals players
Pawtucket Red Sox managers
Portland Sea Dogs managers
Sportspeople from Long Beach, California
Trenton Thunder managers
West Palm Beach Tropics players